The European Science Fiction Society is an international organisation of professionals and fans who are committed to promoting science fiction in Europe and European science fiction worldwide.

The organisation was founded at the first Eurocon (European Science Fiction Convention), which was held in 1972 in Trieste, Italy. Since that time, the organisation has organized Eurocons at least every two years. The organisation also administrates the European SF Awards.

The society's officers (as re-elected in 2022 in Dudelange, Luxembourg) are:
Chairman: Carolina Gómez Lagerlöf, (Sweden)
Secretary: Fionna O'Sullivan (Ireland)
Treasurer: Anouk Arnal (France)
Vice Chairman: Saija Kyllönen (Finland)
Award Administrator: Mikołaj Kowalewski (Poland)

Bridget Wilkinson served as a society officer for 25 years before standing down at the 2016 Eurocon, held in Barcelona, Spain. Before that, she ran Fans Across The World co-ordinating science fiction fans from the former Eastern Europe with their counterparts in the West.

References

External links
 
 Report of the first Eurocon 1972, Italy
 Article on the Eurocons of the 1990s 
 Robert Quaglia: My 25 years of Eurocons and the European Science Fiction Society
 New leadership of European Science Fiction Society

1972 establishments in Italy
International professional associations based in Europe
Arts organizations established in 1972
Science fiction organizations